Rhyparella novempunctata is a species of ulidiid or picture-winged fly in the genus Rhyparella of the family Ulidiidae.

References

Ulidiidae